This is a list of villages in Thrissur district, Kerala, India.

Adat (Thrissur)
Ala
Alapad
Alathur
Alur
Amala Nagar
Amballur(Alagappa Nagar)
Ammadam
Anandapuram
Anjur
Annakara
Annallur
Anthicad
Aranattukara
Arangottukara
Arattupuzha
Arimbur
Arimpur
Ashtamichira
Athani
Attoor
Attore South
Attore North
Avanur
Avittathur
Azhikode
Chalakkal
Chalakudy
Chamakunnu
Chathakudam
Chazhoor
Chelakkara
Chelakode
Chembuthara
Chemmanthatta
Chendrappini
Chengallur
Chentrappinni
Chermanangad
Cherpu
Cheruthuruthi
Cheruval
Chevvoor
Chirakkal
Chiramanangad
Chiranellur
Chittanda
Chittilappilly
Chittatukara
Chiyyaram
Choolissery
Choondal
Chowwannur (Part)
Chowwannur
Desamangalam
Edakkalathur
Edakkazhiyur
Edathirinji
Edathiruthy
Edavilangu
Elanad
Elanjipra
Elavally
Elinjipra
Engandiyur
Enkakkad
Eranellur
Eravathur
Eravimangalam
Eravu
Erayamkudy
Eyyal
Inchamudi
Iranikulam
Irimbranallur
Irinjalakuda
Kadangode
Kadappuram
Kadavallur
Kadikkad
Kadukutty
Kaduppassery
Kainoor
Kaipamangalam
Kaiparamba
Kakkulissery
Kallettumkara
Kalletumkara
Kallur Thekkummuri
Kallur Vadakkummuri
Kallur
Kandanassery
Kandanissery
Kanipayyur (Part)
Kanipayyur
Kaniyarkode
Kanjany
Kanjirakode
Kannamkulangara
Karalam (Part)
Karalam
Karamuck
Karanchira
Karikkad
Kariyannur
Karumanassery
Karumathra
Karumathara
Kattakampal
Kattoor
Kattur
Keralasseri
Killannur
Killimangalam
Kinassery
Kiralur
Kizhakkummuri
Kizhuppillikkara
Kochanoor
Kodakara
Kodaly
Kodannur
Kodassery
Kondazhy
Koolimuttam
Koottala
Koratty
Kottanellur
Kottapadi
Kottappuram
Kozhukkully
Kumaranellur
Kundazhiyur
Kurichikkara
Kurumala
Kurumpilavu
Kuruvilassery
Kuttanchery
Kuthampully
Kuttichira
Kuttoor
Kuzhur
Laloor
Lokamaleswaram (Kodungallur central)
Madakkathara
Madathumpady
Madayikonam
Mambra
Manakkody
Manalithara
Manalur
Manavalassery
Mangad (Part)
Mangad
Mannamangalam
Marottichal
Mathilakam
Mattathur
Mayannur
Melur
Minalur
Mulayam
Mullassery
Mullurkara
Mundathikode
Mupliyam
Muringur Vadakkummuri
Muriyad
Muthuvara
Nandipulam
Nattika
Nedumpura
Nellayi
Nelluwaya
Nooluvally
Olarikara
Ollur
Oorakam
Orumanayur
Padinjare Vemballur
Padiyam
Padiyur
Padukad
Painkulam
Palakkal
Pallippuram
Pallur
Pampady
Pananchery
Panangad
Pangarappilly
Panjal
Pappinivattom
Parakkad
Paralam
Parappukkara
Parekkattukara
Pariyaram
Parlikad
Pattikkad
Pavartty
Pazhanji
Pazhayannur
Peechi
Pengamuck
Peramangalam
Peringandoor
Peringottukara
Perinjanam
Perumpilavu
Peruvallur Thrissur District. Chavakkad Talluk, Mullassery Panchayath , Annakara Village.
Peruvamkulangara, administrative ward near Ollur.
Pidikkaparambu
Pilakkad
Pillakkad
Poomangalam
Pooppathy
Poovathussery
Porathissery
Porkulam
Potta
Poyya
Pudukad
Pulakode
Pullazhi
Pullu
Pullur
Punnayur
Punnayurkulam
Puthenchira
Puthur
Puthuruthy
Puzhakkal
Talikkulam
Thalassery
Thalore
Thangalur
Thanikkudam
Thanniyam
Thayyur
Thazhekkad
Thekkumkara
Thichur
Thirumukkulam
Thiruvilwamala
Tholur
Thonnurkara
Thottippal
Thoykavu
Thrithallur
Trikkur
Vadakkaanchery
Vadakkekad
Vadakkethara
Vadakkumbhagom
Vadakkumkara
Vadakkummuri
Vadama
Vadanappally
Valapad
Valappad
Valiya Chenam
Vallachira
Vallathol Nagar
Vallissery
Vallivattom
Varandarappilly
Varavoor
Velappaya
Vellangallur
Vellani
Vellanikkara
Vellarakkad
Vellatanjoor
Vellattanjur
Vellikulangara
Vellookkara
Velukkara
Velur
Veluthur
Vendore
Venganellur
Venginissery
Venkitangu
Vennur
Viruppakka
Vylathur
Wadakkanchery

See also

Thrissur district
villages in Thrissur